Whichcote is a surname, and may refer to:

Benjamin Whichcote (1609–1683), English cleric, academic and leader of the Cambridge Platonists
Francis Whichcote, 3rd Baronet (c.1692–1775), English politician
George Whichcote (1794–1891), British Army officer
Sir Jeremy Whichcote, 1st Baronet (c. 1614–1677), English barrister
Sir Paul Whichcote, 2nd Baronet (1643–1721), Fellow of the Royal Society
Whichcote baronets